K-18 Karelia is a Project 667BDRM Delfin-class (NATO reporting name: Delta IV) nuclear-powered ballistic missile submarine currently in service with the Russian Navy. It was built in Severodvinsk by Sevmash shipbuilding company and was commissioned in 1989. It was refitted from 2004 to 2009, after which it returned to the navy.

Description 
The complement is about 135-140.

The boat is powered by two VM-4  pressurized water reactors which drive two shafts with seven-bladed fixed-pitch propellers. She can achieve a maximum speed of  when surfaced and  when submerged.

Construction and service 
Karelia was laid down in the Sevmash shipbuilding yard in February 1987 and was launched in 1988.  It bears the name of a region of northwestern Russia (and eastern Finland). It was commissioned into the Soviet Navy in 1989, and after the dissolution of the Soviet Union, it was transferred to the Russian Navy.

Karelia underwent modernisation at Zvezdochka shipyard in northern Russia between 2004 and 2009. The submarine had 100 new components added which included the TVR-671RM rocket torpedo system and the RSM-54 Sineva SLBMs. Other upgrades included noise reduction, better vessel-tracking capabilities and improved survivability.

In April 2000, Vladimir Putin, then the Acting President of Russia, spent the night in the submarine at a depth of over 50 metres, and oversaw the Northern Fleet exercises. Officers demonstrated to Putin how ballistic missiles were launched, and Putin was made an honorary submariner after he followed the traditional submariner's ritual of drinking seawater. In February 2022, the submarine participated in the Grom-2022 strategic nuclear exercises, which were held in the context of the Ukraine crisis. The submarine successfully launched a Sineva ballistic missile from a position in the Barents Sea.

References 

Ships built in the Soviet Union
Delta-class submarines
Cold War submarines of the Soviet Union
Submarines of Russia
Ships of the Russian Northern Fleet
Ships built by Sevmash